Ramakur is a village in old Prakasam district Andhra Pradesh

References

Populated places in Northern Bahr el Ghazal